SG Automotive Group Co Ltd (officially Liaoning Shuguang Automotive Group, Ltd) is a Chinese vehicle and component manufacturer headquartered in Dandong, Liaoning province. The company makes buses, light trucks, semi-trailer trucks, SUVs and automotive components. Auto parts made by SG are used by other Chinese car makers including Brilliance Auto, Chery, and JAC Motors.

Light trucks and buses are sold under the Huanghai (黄海, lit. "Yellow Sea") brand name, whilst the Shuguang brand was used for SUVs in the early 2000s. Some SUVs sold under this brand may utilize Mitsubishi engines as of 2011. The company makes fleet sales, and some products are purchased by the Chinese State.

History
SG was founded in Liaoning in 1984 with RMB 70,000 as a manufacturer of axles for off-road vehicles.

At the beginning of 2007, the parent company Shuguang Automobile Group wholly acquired Changzhou Changjiang Bus Manufacturing Co., Ltd., one of Dandong Huanghai's former competitors and the largest bus share in China before 2003, and changed its name to Changzhou Huanghai.

In August 2012, SG agreed to acquire a 56.19% stake in a Dandong-based special vehicle company from a Liaoning-based group company for RMB 80.9 million.

Operations
SG has component manufacturing facilities in Wuhu, Anhui, and Shenyang, Liaoning. Other facilities include a bus-making factory in Changzhou, Changzhou Changjiang Bus, which became operational in early 2010 and a location-unknown component-making facility 113,220 square meters in size that should have become operational in late 2012.

Products

Current

 Huanghai Major (DD 1023) - pickup truck - Copy of the Toyota Tacoma

 2007-present Huanghai Plutus (DD 1022) - pickup truck - Copy of the Chevrolet Colorado
 2014-present Huanghai N1
 Huanghai N1S
 2015-present Huanghai N2
 Huanghai N2S
 2016-present Huanghai Raytour (DD 504)- van - Copy of the Volkswagen Crafter 
 2017-present Huanghai N3
 2019-present Huanghai N7 - copy of the Chevrolet Silverado

Former
 DG 6471 B 
 DG 6400
2009-2012 Huanghai Challenger (DD 6490P/DD 6491A/Shuguang Challenger) - SUV - rebadged Gonow Jetstar/Dadi Shuttle
 Huanghai Faster NCV - CUV - Concept based on the Landscape V3 with the front end copied from the Pontiac Torrent previewing the Huanghai Landscape V3.
2008-2012 Huanghai Landscape F1 (DD 6460D/DD 6460K/DD 6461A/DD 6470E) - CUV - Copy of Kia Sorento with a front fascia similar to the Mercedes-Benz M-Class
 Huanghai Landscape V3 (DD 6472A/DD 6472B) - CUV - Copy of the Toyota Harrier
 DG 6480 Navigator/Dawn/Falcon
2006-2010 Huanghai Aurora (DD 6470/DD 6470H) - CUV - Copy of the SsangYong Rexton
 DG 1020 "Antilope" or "Aolin"
Huanghai Steed (DD 1020) - pickup truck - Variant of the Plutus
 Shuguang Conqueror (DG6472) - an updated luxury Huanghai Challenger
 Shuguang Runway - a three-door Shuguang Conqueror

Export sales
SG has exported light trucks and buses to countries including Saudi Arabia, South Africa, and Brazil. Some products, including the Plutus and the Steed, are assembled by Effa Motors in Uruguay.

Some of its production has been sold in Malaysia, where the Plutus pick-up was on sale as of late 2012.

References

External links 
 SG Automotive Group website

Bus manufacturers of China
Dandong
Car manufacturers of China
Vehicle manufacturing companies established in 1984
Chinese companies established in 1984
Companies based in Liaoning
Companies listed on the Shanghai Stock Exchange
Truck manufacturers of China
Automotive companies of China
Chinese brands